Lumpia are various types of spring rolls commonly found in the Philippines and Indonesia. Lumpia are made of thin paper-like or crepe-like pastry skin called "lumpia wrapper" enveloping savory or sweet fillings. It is often served as an appetizer or snack, and might be served deep fried or fresh (unfried). Lumpia are Filipino and Indonesian adaptations of the Fujianese and Teochew popiah, which was created during the 17th century in the former Spanish colonial era.

In the Philippines, lumpia is one of the most common dishes served in gatherings and celebrations. In Indonesia lumpia has become a favorite snack, and is known as a street hawker food in the country. 

In the Netherlands and Belgium, it is spelled loempia, the old Indonesian spelling, which has also become the generic name for "spring roll" in Dutch. A variant is the Vietnamese lumpia, wrapped in a thinner pastry, though still close in size to a spring roll, in which the wrapping closes the ends off completely, which is typical for lumpia.

Etymology
The name lumpia or sometimes spelled as lunpia was derived from Hokkien spelling /lun˩piã˥˧/ (潤餅), lun (潤) means "wet/moist/soft", while pia (餅) means "cake/pastry", thus lun-pia means "soft cake". It is referred to as rùnbǐng (潤餅) or báobǐng (薄餅) in Mandarin, and also as bópíjuǎn (薄皮卷).

In neighboring Malaysia and Singapore, lumpia is known in its variant name as popiah, from the Chaoshan dialect pronounced as /poʔ˩piã˥˧/ (薄餅), which means "thin wafer."

Varieties

Philippines

Lumpia was introduced to the Philippines during the pre-colonial period by early Hokkien immigrants and traders from Fujian between 900 and 1565 AD. The name is derived from Hokkien, a language that originated in southeastern China: "lun" means wet, moist, or soft, and "pia" means cake or pastry. They have been thoroughly nativized to Philippine cuisine and are found throughout the islands. They use various fillings inspired by local ingredients and dishes, and the later cuisines of Spain, China, and the United States.

Filipino lumpia can be differentiated from other Asian spring roll versions in that they use a paper-thin wrapper made from just flour, water, and salt. They were also traditionally slender and long, with a shape roughly similar to that of cigars or cigarillos, though modern versions can come in various shapes and sizes. The thinness of the crêpe and the shape of the lumpia give them a relatively denser wrapping that nevertheless remains flaky and light in texture. They are also traditionally dipped in agre dulce (sweet and sour sauce), vinegar-based sauces, banana ketchup, or sweet chili sauce. Fresh lumpia, however, have wrappers that are more crêpe-like and thicker due to the addition of eggs (though still thinner than other Asian versions). They are closer in texture to the original Chinese versions and were traditionally made with rice flour which makes them chewier. Various kinds of lumpia, fried or fresh, are ubiquitous in Filipino celebrations like fiestas or Christmas.

Filipino lumpia also have a unique and extremely popular dessert subcategory, the turón. These lumpia variants are either cooked with a glazing of caramelized sugar, sprinkled with granular sugar, or drizzled in latík (coconut caramel), a syrup, or honey. Turón are traditionally filled with ripe saba bananas and jackfruit, but they can also be made with a wide variety of other sweet fillings, from sweet potato to ube.

Daral

Another dessert lumpia, Daral (called Balolon among the Maranao) originates from the Tausūg people in Mindanao. The wrapper is made from unsweetened, ground glutinous rice and coconut milk (galapóng), and is filled with sweetened coconut meat (hinti).

Dinamita

Dinamita or "dynamite lumpia" is a deep-fried variant stuffed with a whole chili pepper wrapped in a thin egg crêpe. The stuffing is usually giniling (ground beef or pork), cheese, and spices, but it can also be adapted to use a wide variety of other ingredients, including tocino, hamón, bacon, and shredded chicken. It is commonly eaten as an appetizer or as a companion to beer.

Lumpiang adobo
A type of lumpia filled with shredded meat that has been cooked adobo style.

Lumpiang gulay

Lumpiang gulay ("vegetable spring roll") usually consists of various chopped vegetables and a small amount of pork or shrimp. The types of vegetables can vary greatly, and is a fried version. It is not vegetarian by default, but vegan and vegetarian versions can be made from the basic recipe.

Lumpiang hubád

Lumpiang hubád ("naked spring roll") is lumpiang sariwà (fresh lumpia) served without the crêpe wrapping. The lack of a wrapper technically does not make lumpia, but is an alternative way of serving fresh lumpia's traditional fillings.

Lumpiang isdâ
Lumpiang isdâ ("fish lumpia") is filled primarily with fish flakes and fried. It is also known as lumpiang galunggóng (blackfin scad), lumpiang bangús (milkfish), lumpiang tulingán (yellowfin tuna), etc., depending on the type of fish used. A common version of this combines fish flakes with malunggay (moringa) leaves.

Lumpiang keso

Lumpiang keso, more commonly known as "cheese lumpia" or "cheese sticks", is deep-fried lumpia with a slice of cheese (often cheddar) as filling. It is usually served with a dipping sauce made of banana ketchup and mayonnaise.

Lumpiang labong
Lumpiang labóng is similar to lumpiang ubód but is made with labóng (bamboo shoot), rather than heart of palm, making it more like the Indonesian lumpia rebung. It can be eaten fresh or fried.

Lumpiang prito
Lumpiang prito ("fried spring roll"), is the generic name for a subclass of lumpia that is fried. It usually refers to lumpiang gulay or lumpiang togue. They can come in sizes as small as lumpiang shanghai or as big as lumpiang sariwà. It is usually eaten with vinegar and chili peppers, or a mixture of soy sauce and calamansi juice known as toyomansî.

Lumpiang sariwà

Lumpiang sariwà (Tagalog: "fresh spring roll") or "fresh lumpia", consists of minced vegetables and/or various pre-cooked meat or seafood and jicama (singkamás) as an extender, encased in a double wrapping of lettuce leaf and a yellowish egg crêpe. An egg is often used as a binding agent for the wrap. The accompanying sauce is made from chicken or pork stock, a starch mixture, crushed and roasted peanuts, and fresh garlic. This variety is not fried and is usually around five centimeters in diameter and 15 centimeters in length. It is derived from the original Chinese popiah.

Lumpiang Shanghai

Lumpiang Shanghai is regarded as the most widespread type of lumpia and the most commonly served in Filipino gatherings. It is characteristically filled with sautéed ground pork, minced onion, carrots, and spices, with the mixture sometimes held together by beaten egg. It has numerous variants that contain other ingredients like green peas, kintsáy (Chinese parsley) or raisins. Lumpiang Shanghai is commonly served with agre dulce, but ketchup (tomato or banana) and vinegar are popular alternatives. This variant is typically smaller than other lumpia. Despite the name, it did not originate in Shanghai or China.

Lumpiang singkamás
Lumpiang singkamás is similar to lumpiang ubod, but it is made primarily with julienned strips of jicama rather than heart of palm. It can be eaten fresh or fried.

Lumpiang togue

This version of lumpiang gulay is filled primarily with bean sprouts (togue) and various other vegetables such as string beans and carrots. Small morsels of meat, seafood, or tofu may be added. Though it is the least expensive of the variants, the preparation  the cutting of vegetables and meats into small pieces and pre-cooking these  can be taxing and labor-intensive. It is a fried version.

Lumpiang ubód

Lumpiang ubód is a variation made of julienned ubód (heart of the coconut tree) as the main ingredient. They can be fried or served as lumpiang sariwà. It originates from Silay, Negros Occidental, where a variant, lumpiang Silay, is still popular.

Lumpiang pancit
A type of lumpia where the filling consists of pancit, a popular Filipino noodle dish. Most likely created from the turo-turo or karinderias that have leftover pancit, often the sótanghon (mung bean noodle) or bihon (rice noodle varieties, as fillers within the lumpia.

Ngohiong

Ngohiong is a variant of lumpia distinctively seasoned with five-spice powder. It is derived from the Hokkien dish ngo hiang (kikiám in the Philippines) and originated in Cebu City.

Turón

Turón, also known as lumpiang saging, banana lumpia, or banana rolls, is a golden-brown snack that is usually made of sliced saba bananas and jackfruit or cheese in a lumpia wrapper, sprinkled with brown sugar, and deep-fried. It is sometimes paired with ice cream or pancake syrup. This snack is sold in the streets of most cities in the country alongside maruya, banana cue, and camote cue. Different variants have emerged using different ingredients: such as manggáng turón (mango), kamote turon (sweet potato), turón de maní (peanut), chocolate turón, and ube turon or turón halayá (mashed purple yam).

Indonesia

Chinese influence is evident in Indonesian cuisine, such as bakmi, mie ayam, pangsit, mie goreng, kwetiau goreng, nasi goreng, bakso, and lumpia. Throughout the country, spring rolls are generally called lumpia; however, sometimes an old Chinese Indonesian spelling is used: loen pia.

In Indonesia lumpia is associated with Chinese Indonesian cuisine and commonly found in cities where significant Chinese Indonesian settles. Although some local variants exist and the filling ingredients may vary, the most popular variant is Lumpia Semarang, available in fried or unfried variants. In Indonesia, lumpia variants usually named after the city where the recipe originates, with Semarang as the most famous variant. It represents creativity and the localisation of lumpia recipes according to locally available ingredients and local tastes.

Unlike its Philippines counterpart, Indonesian lumpia rarely uses minced pork as a filling. This was meant to cater to the larger Muslim clientele, thus popular fillings are usually chicken, shrimp, egg and vegetables. Indonesian lumpia is commonly filled with seasoned chopped rebung (bamboo shoots) with minced chicken or prawns, served with fresh baby shallots or leeks in sweet tauco (fermented soy) based sauce. In addition to being made at home, lumpia is also offered as street food sold by traveling vendor on carts, sold in foodstalls specializing on Lumpia Semarang, or sold in traditional marketplaces as part of kue (Indonesian traditional snack) or jajan pasar (market munchies). Simpler and cheaper lumpia is sold as part of gorengan (Indonesian fritters). Indonesians are noted for their fondness of hot and spicy food, and therefore spicy hot sambal chili sauce or fresh bird's eye chili are usually added as a dipping sauce or condiment.

Lumpia Semarang

Named after the capital city of Central Java in Indonesia, Semarang, where significant Chinese Indonesian have settled, lumpia Semarang is perhaps the most popular lumpia variant in Indonesia. It has become associated with the city, and the spring rolls are often sought by the visitors in Semarang as food gift or souvenir. Originally made by Chinese immigrants, this lumpia is filled with bamboo shoots, dried shrimp, chicken, and/or prawns. It is served with a sweet chili sauce made from dried shrimp (optional), coconut sugar, red chili peppers, bird's eye chili peppers, ground white pepper, tapioca starch, water, and baby shallots. Lumpia Semarang is served either deep-fried or unfried, as the filling is already cooked.

Lumpia Jakarta
Named after Indonesian capital city, Jakarta, this lumpia is usually being deep fried and sold as gorengan fritter snack. Unlike popular Semarang lumpia that uses rebung or bamboo shoots, Jakarta lumpia uses bengkuang or jicama, and served with typical Indonesian sambal kacang or spicy peanut sauce as a dipping sauce.

Lumpia Bogor
Named after Bogor, a city in West Java, this lumpia filling is almost similar with Jakarta lumpia; uses jicama, and added with tofu and ebi dried shrimp. Unlike other regions that are fried, Bogor lumpia are usually grilled on hot iron, giving off a distinctive aroma. In addition, Bogor lumpia is usually shaped rectangle like a pillow and quite large in size.

Lumpia Bandung
Named after the city of Bandung in West Java, it is a variant of lumpia basah or fresh and wet lumpia that is not being deep fried. However, unlike common rolled elongated fresh lumpia, lumpia Bandung is not served in spring roll form, but the lumpia skin is spread, topped with fillings, stacked and folded square just like an envelope. Unlike Semarang style lumpia that uses bamboo shoots and minced chicken, Bandung style lumpia filling uses julienned jicama, beansprout, scallion, garlic, chili, and scrambled egg, with palm sugar sauce.

Lumpia Surabaya
Named after the city of Surabaya in East Java, where this lumpia was originally made. It is made of mostly the same ingredients of lumpia semarang, but much less sweet in taste. Lumpia Surabaya might uses bamboo shoots, corn, or slices of sausages as fillings, and served with sambal chili sauce and tauco fermented soybean paste as dipping sauce.

Lumpia Yogyakarta
Although Yogyakarta is quite close to Semarang city, Yogyakarta also has a different type of lumpia. Yogya typical lumpia usually contain jicama, bean sprouts, carrots, and minced chicken meat; and sometimes stuff like boiled quail eggs and glass noodles are added as fillings. Yogya lumpia is usually served with acar pickles, chilies, and toppings made from crushed garlic and jicama. The generous use of garlic and pickles as garnishing was meant to refresh and neutralize the otherwise oily deep-fried lumpia.

Lumpia Medan
Originated from Medan city of North Sumatra, this lumpia version is more akin to popiah of neighboring Malaysia and Singapore, thus in Medan lumpia is more commonly called as popiah. Medan popiah or lumpia is a large fresh unfried spring roll, consumed not as a snack, but as a main meal. This was because Medan lumpias are made in large sizes with rich fillings, including bamboo shoots, scrambled eggs, peanuts, shrimp, crabs, etc.

Lumpia goreng

Lumpia goreng is a simple fried spring roll filled with vegetables; the spring roll wrappers are filled with chopped carrots cut into matchstick-size, shredded cabbage, and sometimes mushrooms. Although usually filled only with vegetables, the fried spring rolls might be enriched with minced beef, chicken, or prawns. There is also a common, cheap and simple variant of fried lumpia, eaten not as a single dish but as part of assorted gorengan (Indonesian fritters) snack, sold together with fried battered tempeh, tofu, oncom, sweet potato and cassava. The filling is simple and modest, only filled with bihun (rice vermicelli) with chopped carrots and cabbages. Usually eaten with fresh bird's eye chili pepper. The sliced lumpia goreng is also the ingredient of soto mie (noodle soto).

Lumpia basah

It literally means "wet spring roll", or often translated as "fresh spring roll" which means spring roll without frying. It is similar to the Vietnamese spring roll with bean sprouts, carrots, shrimp and/or chicken, and served with sweet tauco (another Hokkien word for salted soybeans) sauce.

Lumpia ayam
This popular appetizer in Indonesia is chicken lumpia, with fillings including shredded chicken, sliced carrot, onion and garlic; and seasoned with sugar, salt and pepper. In Yogyakarta, there is a popular chicken lumpia variant called Lumpia Mutiara, sold in front of Mutiara Hotel in Malioboro street.

Lumpia sayur
Vegetarian lumpia, usually filled with glass noodles, shredded cabbage, lettuce, julienned carrots, minced garlic and celery, seasoned with soy sauce and sweet chili sauce. Most of cheaper lumpia sold as part of Indonesian gorengan (fritters) are lumpia sayur or vegetables lumpia, that contains only bits of carrots and bihun rice glass noodles.

Lumpia mercon

The name lumpia mercon (lit. firecracker lumpia) implies that this lumpia is extra hot and spicy, filled with slices of cabe rawit or bird's eye chili, a small type of chili that is very spicy and much hotter than a common jalapeño. This lumpia demonstrates the Indonesian fondness for extra hot and spicy food.

Lumpia mini
This is a bite size smaller lumpia snack, a skin pastry crepe the same as with common lumpia; however, it is filled only with abon (beef floss) or ebi (dried prawn floss).

Lumpia dulek
Lumpia dulek, also known as lumpia delanggu or sosis kecut (sour sausages) is a simple and cheap lumpia snack from Delanggu subdistrict, Klaten Regency, Central Java, a town located between Yogyakarta and Semarang. It is a small finger-sized lumpia filled with mung bean sprouts (tauge) with slightly sour flavour.

Lumpia tahu
Another vegetarian lumpia in Indonesia is lumpia tahu or tofu lumpia. It is filled with tofu and diced carrot, lightly seasoned, and deep-fried. Usually, its size is smaller than common lumpia, and consumed as a snack. Sometimes beaten egg and chopped scallion might be added to the filling mixture.

Lumpia telur
This simple and cheap street food is a popular snack among Indonesian school children. Lumpia telur is an egg lumpia, which is lumpia skin placed upon a hot flat pan, topped with beaten egg and chopped scallion, folded, and fried with cooking oil. Sometimes slices of sausages are added. The shape is not cylindrical like a common spring roll, but rather a flat half-circle, drizzled with kecap manis sweet soy sauce and chili sambal. It is often regarded as a hybrid between lumpia and egg martabak.

Lumpia jantung pisang
Lumpia with filling made of jantung pisang (lit. banana's heart) which refer to banana blossom bud, mixed with eggs, seasoned with shallot, garlic, turmeric and pepper, served in hot sambal chili sauce.

Lumpia udang mayones
Seafood lumpia, filled with shrimp, diced carrots, scallions, garlic and mayonnaise. Actually, the popularity of mayonnaise-filled snack was started by another Indonesian popular snack called risole. Risole is quite similar to lumpia, with the difference in skin texture – in which risoles' skin is thicker, softer, and breaded. This novelty risole recipe with mayo flavor then spin-off using lumpia skin to become a new lumpia variant.

Piscok

Piscok is an abbreviation of pisang cokelat (banana chocolate in Indonesian). It is a sweet snack made of pieces of banana with chocolate syrup, wrapped inside lumpia skin and being deep fried. Pisang cokelat is often simply described as "choco banana spring rolls". It is often regarded as a hybrid between another Indonesian favourites; pisang goreng (fried banana) and lumpia (spring roll).

The type of banana being used is similar to pisang goreng; preferably pisang uli, pisang kepok or pisang raja sereh. Pisang cokelat is almost identical to Philippines turon, except in this Indonesian version chocolate content is a must.

Sumpia

The much smaller and drier lumpia with similar beef or prawn floss filling is called sumpia. Its diameter is about the same as human finger. In Indonesia, the most common filling for sumpia is ebi or dried shrimp floss, spiced with coriander, lemon leaf, garlic and shallot. These miniature lumpias are deep fried in ample of palm oil until golden brown and crispy. Sumpia has a more crunchy and drier texture and is often consumed as a savory kue snack.

The Netherlands 

In the Netherlands, lumpia is called loempia, an old Indonesian spelling. It was introduced to the Netherlands through its colonial links with Indonesia. In the Netherlands, loempia is described as a large Indonesian version of Chinese spring rolls, stuffed with minced meat, bean sprouts, and cabbage leaves, and flavored with soy sauce, garlic, and green onion. Loempia is one of the popular snacks sold in the Dutch snack bars or eetcafé.

Vietnamese loempia  

The Vietnamese loempia is a variant of the loempia introduced by Vietnamese refugees during the mid-1980s. Vietnamese loempia's are typically sold in mobile Vietnamese snack bars known as loempiakramen and are typically served with a special sauce known as loempiasaus, this special sauce was invented for the Dutch consumer because in Vietnam they are typically served with fish sauce. In contrast to the Chinese loempia the Vietnamese loempia is typically long and narrow.

Loempidel 

The loempidel (or Vietnamese frikandel) is a variant of the loempia introduced in March 2019 by the Dutch food company Vanreusel, its name is a portmanteau of "loempia" and "frikandel". The snack consists of a frikandel with sweet sauce wrapped in a coat of phyllo, the phyllo coat being similar to that of another Dutch snack known as the Vietnamese loempia.

Lumpia wrapper

Philippines

Filipino lumpia wrappers generally come in two variants. The most common variant used mostly for fried lumpia is made from just flour, water, salt, and optionally cornstarch. This type of wrapper is characteristically paper-thin, much thinner than other spring roll wrappers. The ingredients are mixed into a wet dough, then left to sit for a few hours before cooking. A ball of dough is taken with one hand and smeared into a heated large flat metal plate greased with oil until a very thin circular film of it adheres to the pan and fries. It is cooked for a few seconds then quickly taken out and left to dry.

For "fresh" (non-fried) lumpia, the wrappers are usually made with egg in addition to the other basic ingredients (and it may use rice flour). This essentially turns it into a thin egg crêpe. It is still thinner than other spring roll variants, but much thicker and softer than variants made from just flour and water.

In modern mass production, Filipino lumpia wrappers are generally made by automated assembly-line machines similar to those used to make spring roll wrappers, differing only in the recipe and the thickness of the wrapper. It uses a revolving drum.

Vegan versions of the wrapper exclude eggs, and is instead just made with flour, salt, and water, which results in a thinner translucent wrap. These are also sealed with water, not an egg wash.

Popularity

Lumpia have such enduring popularity that one can see at least one variant in almost any set of Filipino or Indonesian festivities. Despite its Chinese origin, in the United States, lumpia is associated with Filipino cuisine, while in Europe, especially in the Netherlands, it is associated with Indonesian cuisine, owed to their shared colonial links. The distinct taste and ease of preparation (the Shanghai variant at least) have caused lumpia to be one of the staple food products on the menus of many Filipino restaurants in the United States and around the world.

See also

 Popiah
 Bakpia (Hopia)
 Crepe
 Egg roll
 Spring roll
 Turon
 Daral
 Gỏi cuốn 
 Chả giò
 Javanese cuisine
 Chinese Indonesian cuisine
 Filipino Chinese cuisine
 List of stuffed dishes

References

External links

 Lumpia Semarang Recipe (Semarang Style Springroll)

Appetizers
Indonesian Chinese cuisine
Javanese cuisine
Street food in Indonesia
Stuffed dishes
Philippine cuisine
Philippine fusion cuisine
Guamanian cuisine
Palauan cuisine
Deep fried foods